Saint Zenobius (337–417) is venerated as the first bishop of Florence.  His feast day is celebrated on May 25.

Life

Born of a Florentine noble family, Zenobius was educated by his pagan parents.  He came under the influence early of the bishop Theodore, was baptized by him, and succeeded, after much opposition, in bringing his father and mother to Christianity. He embraced the clerical state, and rapidly rose to the position of archdeacon, when his virtues and notable powers as a preacher made him known to Saint Ambrose, at whose instance Pope Damasus I (r. 366–386) called him to Rome, and employed him in various important missions, including a legation to Constantinople. On the death of Damasus he returned to his native city, where he resumed his apostolic labours, and on the death of the bishop of that see, Zenobius, to the great joy of the people, was appointed to succeed him. His deacons are venerated as Saint Eugene and Saint Crescentius.  He evangelized Florence and its outskirts completely and combated Arianism. 

According to his biographer and successor in the See of Florence, Antonius, he died in his ninetieth year, in 424; but, as Antonius says that Pope Innocent I (d. 417) was at the time pope, the date is uncertain. 

There are grounds for believing that he actually died in 417, on 25 May, on which day the ancient tower where he is supposed to have lived, near the Ponte Vecchio, was annually decorated with flowers.

Veneration
His body was first buried in the Basilica di San Lorenzo di Firenze (consecrated by Saint Ambrose in 393), and was later translated to the church of Santa Maria del Fiore.  

In the back of the middle of the three apses is the altar of Saint Zenobius. Its bronze shrine, designed around 1440, a masterpiece of Ghiberti, contains the urn with his relics. The central relief shows us one of his miracles, the reviving of a dead child. Above this shrine is the painting Last Supper by Giovanni Balducci. There was also a glass-paste mosaic panel The Bust of Saint Zanobius by the 16th century miniaturist Monte di Giovanni, but it is now on display in the Museo dell'Opera del Duomo.

Miracles

Extraordinary miracles, including several instances of the restoration of the dead to life, are attributed to him.  Zenobius is said to have resurrected several dead people.  It is also said that after his death, a dead elm burst into life after his body touched it while being borne to the cathedral for burial.    

A legend states that a child was once run over by a cart while playing. His mother, a widow, wailed as she brought the dead child to Zenobius' deacon. By means of a prayer, Saint Zenobius revived the child and restored him to his mother.

In art
Zenobius is often depicted with a dead child or man in his arms, or a flowering elm, both in reference to his miracles.  

Sandro Botticelli depicted the life and work of Saint Zenobius in four paintings. In the first scene, Zenobius is shown twice: he rejects the bride that his parents intended him to take in marriage and walks thoughtfully away. The other episodes show the baptism of the young Zenobius and his mother, and on the right his ordination as bishop. 

On the wall of the Palazzo Vecchio are frescoes by Domenico Ghirlandaio, painted in 1482. The apotheosis of Saint Zenobius was painted with a perspectival illusion of the background.

Notes

References 
 Ferguson, George (1961). Signs and Symbols in Christian Art (New York: Oxford University Press), 147.

External links

 Saints of May 25: Zenobius of Florence
  Santi e beati: San Zanobi
 Zenobius Xavierus of Poland

337 births
417 deaths
5th-century bishops
5th-century Christian saints
Ancient Roman saints
Bishops of Florence
Saints from Roman Italy
Miracle workers